Aarwangen District was a district in the northeast corner of the canton of Bern in Switzerland, with its seat at Aarwangen. It was disbanded on 31 December 2009. Its municipalities became part of the administrative region Emmental-Oberaargau.

It was surrounded by the canton of Solothurn on the north, the canton of Aargau on the northeast, the canton of Lucerne on the east, the district of Trachselwald on the south, the district of Burgdorf on the southwest, and the district of Wangen on the west.

The district includes the following 25 municipalities and has an area of :

CH-4912 Aarwangen
CH-4944 Auswil
CH-4913 Bannwil
CH-3368 Bleienbach
CH-4917 Busswil bei Melchnau
CH-4955 Gondiswil
CH-4932 Gutenberg
CH-4936 Kleindietwil
CH-4900 Langenthal
CH-4935 Leimiswil
CH-4932 Lotzwil
CH-4934 Madiswil
CH-4917 Melchnau
CH-4924 Obersteckholz
CH-4943 Oeschenbach
CH-4919 Reisiswil
CH-4914 Roggwil
CH-4938 Rohrbach
CH-4938 Rohrbachgraben
CH-4933 Rütschelen
CH-4911 Schwarzhäusern 
CH-4922 Thunstetten
CH-4916 Untersteckholz
CH-4937 Ursenbach
CH-4923 Wynau

Former districts of the canton of Bern